Below are the squads for the Men's football tournament at 2016 South Asian Games, hosted by India, which will take place between 5 February 2016 and 16 February 2016.

Group A

Coach:  Lee Johnson





Group B



Coach:

Coach:  Raju Kaji Shakya

See also
 Football at the 2016 South Asian Games – Women's team squads

References

2016 in association football
South Asian Games football squads